The French Open is a darts tournament of BDO category B and WDF category 2. It has been held annually since 1977.

List of winners

Men's

Women's

Youth's

Tournament records
 Most wins 3:  Stefan Lord. 
 Most Finals 4:  Stefan Lord. 
 Most Semi Finals 3:  Rod Harrington,  Leo Laurens.
 Most Quarter Finals 3:  Rod Harrington,  Leo Laurens,  Glenn Brooksbank,  Tanguy Borra.
 Most Appearances 5:  Tanguy Borra.
 Most Prize Money won €3,800:  Alan Norris.
 Best winning average (.) :   v's 
 Youngest Winner age 17:   Ron Meulenkamp.
 Oldest Winner age 56:  Martin Adams.

See also
List of BDO ranked tournaments
List of WDF tournaments

References

External links
Federation France Darts
ffdarts.fr : French Open – Registrations List

1977 establishments in France
Darts tournaments